A viceroyalty was an entity headed by a viceroy. It dates back to the Spanish conquest of the Americas in the sixteenth century.

France
Viceroyalty of New France

Portuguese Empire
In the scope of the Portuguese Empire, the term "Viceroyalty of Brazil" is also occasionally used to designate the colonial State of Brazil, in the historic period while its governors had the title of "Viceroy". Some of the governors of Portuguese India were also called "Viceroy".
Viceroyalty of Brazil
Governors of Portuguese India

Russian Empire
List of viceroyalties of the Russian Empire

Spanish Empire
The viceroyalty was a local, political, social, and administrative institution, created by the Spanish monarchy in the sixteenth century, for ruling its overseas territories.

The administration over the vast territories of the Spanish Empire was carried out by viceroys, who became governors of an area, which was considered not as a colony but as a province of the empire, with the same rights as any other province in Peninsular Spain.

The Spanish Americas had four viceroyalties:
Viceroyalty of New Spain
Viceroyalty of Peru
Viceroyalty of the Río de la Plata
Viceroyalty of New Granada

United Kingdom
 The representative of the British executive in Ireland from the Williamite period until independence was known as the Viceroy of Ireland.

British Empire
British Raj, which was governed by a Governor-General and Viceroy, commonly shortened to "Viceroy of India".

See also
Viceroy

References

Types of geographical division
Monarchy